Ernst Glück Bible Museum is a Latvian Christian museum in Alūksne in Latvia. It was in this place that Johann Ernst Glück famously translated the Holy Bible into the Latvian language. It is now designated as a museum to honour his work.

Alūksne
Museums in Latvia
Christianity in Latvia
Religious museums
Bible-themed museums, zoos, and botanical gardens
Religious organisations based in Latvia